The 1987 Campionati Internazionali di Sicilia was a men's tennis tournament played on outdoor clay courts in Palermo, Italy that was part of the 1987 Nabisco Grand Prix. It was the ninth edition of the tournament and took place from 28 September until 4 October 1987. First-seeded Martín Jaite won the singles title.

Finals

Singles

 Martín Jaite defeated  Karel Nováček 7–6(7–5), 6–7(7–9), 6–4
 It was Jaite's 2nd singles title of the year and the 5th of his career.

Doubles

 Leonardo Lavalle /  Claudio Panatta defeated  Petr Korda /  Tomáš Šmíd 3–6, 6–4, 6–4

References

External links
 ITF – tournament edition details

Campionati Internazionali di Sicilia
Campionati Internazionali di Sicilia
Campionati Internazionali di Sicilia